Cyperus oxylepis is a species of sedge that is native to southern parts of North America, Central America and South America.

See also 
 List of Cyperus species

References 

oxylepis
Plants described in 1853
Flora of Argentina
Flora of Colombia
Flora of Ecuador
Flora of Guatemala
Flora of Guyana
Flora of Honduras
Flora of Jamaica
Flora of Mexico
Flora of Nicaragua
Flora of Paraguay
Flora of Peru
Flora of Venezuela
Taxa named by Christian Gottfried Daniel Nees von Esenbeck
Flora without expected TNC conservation status